Solar power in Kansas has been growing in recent years due to new technological improvements and a variety of regulatory actions and financial incentives.

It is estimated that 41.7% of electricity in Kansas could be provided by 12,500 MW of rooftop solar panels.

In 2015, IKEA installed the largest solar array in the state, 730 kW on the roof of its store in Merriam. In 2011, Kansas's largest solar array, 118 kW, was the rooftop installation at Peeper Ranch in Lenexa. Its output is available online.

Net metering
The state's net metering program allows residential installations of up to 25 kW and 200 kW non-residential on-site electrical generation to roll over any excess generation to the next month, but any excess at the end of the year is lost. Participation is limited to 1% of utility's previous year peak demand. Many of the states have net metering policies that are inadequate for 100% renewable energy. Kansas was given a C for net metering and an F for interconnection policies.

Statistics

See also

List of power stations in Kansas
Wind power in Kansas
Solar power in the United States
Renewable energy in the United States

References

External links
Incentives and policies
Kansas Solar Energy
Kansas Solar Radiation Map

Kansas
Energy in Kansas